Nazgûl are fictional undead men from The Lord of the Rings. It may also refer to:
Nazgûl, the nickname of a fictional American occult intelligence agency in Charles Stross's Laundry novels
Nazgul Von Armageddon, a stage name of one of the musicians in black metal band Satanic Warmaster
Nazgûl, a fictional rock and roll band in George R. R. Martin's novel The Armageddon Rag
Nazgul, a compound of Naz (name) and Gul (name) is a common Persian and Turkish feminine given name meaning "Shy rose".

See also
 Gulnaz (disambiguation)